Burkina Faso participated at the 2015 Summer Universiade in Gwangju, South Korea.

Medal summary

Medal by sports

Medalists

Other Participants
 Diane Kiendrebeogo

References
 Country overview: Burkina Faso on the official website

Sport in Burkina Faso
Nations at the 2015 Summer Universiade
Burkina Faso at the Summer Universiade